Karkamb is a village in Pandharpur Tehsil in Solapur district of the state of Maharashtra, India. Karkamb is the biggest village in Pandharpur Tehsil by population and it is mainly known for grapes production. Its name is derived from Kankamba Devi Temple in the village.

Demographics
In 2011, the village had 2,845 households and a population of 16398 (9,073males and 8,383 females).

History

Karkamb is a well known historical place. The village has historical significance. Karkamb was a prominent part of the Maratha Empire. Sambhaji Maharaj visited Karkamb in during their reign. It is said  that the temple of the 'KANKAMBA DEVI' (Village Deity) was built by the Chhatrapati Sambhaji Maharaj.
Karkamb is also famous as a birthplace of 'Bajari Amati' (Market Curry).

Kankamba Devi Temple
Chatrapati Shivaji Maharaj historical steps are in Karkamb village.
Kankamba Devi Temple in Karkamb from whom the village of Karkamb derives its name. Each year festival  is celebrated. Many events are arranged during this period. Temple is famous and many peoples visit from all around nearby villages.

Makdum Shah Baba Dargah

Each year a Fair (Urs or Urus or jatra) is arranged and celebrated in Karkamb, which is a symbol of Hindu-Muslim unity in the village.

Notable landmarks
 Kankamba Devi Temple
 Makdum Shah Baba Tomb
 Lal Masoba
 Vijay Sugar
 Gajanan Bappa Sanjiwan Samadhi
 Sidhhanath temple

Economy

Karkamb's economy is primarily driven by agriculture. Grape processing factories and sugar factories are found in the area.

Karkamb is famous for grape production. Kanak Chaman a co-operative company established in 1985 made big changes to the economy in karkamb. They built India's first co-operative cold storage in Karkamb. It is enraguated by chief minister of maharashtra Mr Sharad Pawar. Karkamb grapes are exported to the Western and several Middle Eastern countries.

Nowadays Pomegranate orchards and its production is very large in Karkamb.

Transportation

Karkamb have important road connection on the Pandharpur-Tembhurni route. S.T Buses are passes from Pandharpur, Tembhurni and Solapur. Distance between Karkamb and Solapur is 78.6 km vie NH65 and 89.5 km vie NH204 (Tembhurni to Pandharpur) and NH65. Distance between Karkamb and Pandharpur is 22.0 km. Distance between Karkamb and Tembhurni is 26.5 km.

Education

Colleges and schools found in Karkamb include the following:
 Adarsh Prashala & Jr. College Karkamb
 Dayanand College Commities, Rambhau Joshi, High school, Karkamb
 New English School, Karkamb
 Galaxy English Medium School

References 

Villages in Solapur district